The Kill Team is a 2019 American war drama film written and directed by Dan Krauss. It is a fictionalized adaptation of the Maywand District murders, which were also explored by Krauss's 2013 documentary of the same name. It stars Alexander Skarsgård, Nat Wolff, Rob Morrow, Adam Long, Jonathan Whitesell,  Brian Marc, Osy Ikhile, and Anna Francolini. The film follows a young U.S. Army recruit (Wolff) who becomes conflicted with his morals when his platoon, under his superior, Sergeant Deeks (Skarsgård), participate in murdering civilians in Afghanistan.

It had its world premiere at the Tribeca Film Festival on April 27, 2019, and was released theatrically and streaming on October 25, 2019, by A24.

Plot
In 2009, Andrew Briggman is a young recruit for U.S. Army in Afghanistan. When Sergeant Wallace is killed in an IED explosion during a raid in a village, Staff Sergeant Deeks assumes the position as the leader of the platoon. Deeks tells the platoon that they will find whoever was responsible for the deaths of 24 American soldiers by raiding the villages. Briggman provides a list of IED attacks by date and location to Deeks. Bravo Company captures a wounded man, who is accused of planting an IED on the road, and Deeks orders Briggman to hurt the man but Briggman refuses.

On the first raid under the leadership of Deeks, Briggman hears a gunshot and arrives at the scene where he finds a young boy lying dead on the ground; the platoon claimed that the boy tried to attack them with a grenade, prompting the soldiers to shoot him. However, Briggman is skeptical, believing that the child was innocent. Inside the barracks, Briggman uses his laptop to send a message to his father about the murder of the young boy, prompting his father to call the Criminal Investigation Division (CID) to investigate Deeks.

Briggman is summoned to the tent where he finds Deeks assaulting a soldier, Marquez, whom Deeks accuses of calling the CID, with his platoon in attendance. Marquez is subsequently hospitalized. Knowing that Deeks is aware of this, Briggman phones his father to stop calling the CID. On the second raid, Briggman witnesses Rayburn coldly executing an unarmed man and planting an AK-47 next to him to make it look like the man fought back. At this point, Briggman becomes disillusioned.

Back at the barracks, Briggman sends a message to his father about the incident. Briggman then goes to Deeks' office and finds the bag full of weapons, but Deeks catches him; Briggman tells Deeks that the unarmed man didn't deserve to die. Deeks also believes that the people in the villages are "co-operators" of the Jihadists. Deeks approaches Briggman at his bed and tells him that he is now aware of his actions against him. Briggman phones his father and breaks down in tears while describing the dangerous position that he is in.

On the third raid, the team is attacked by an unseen figure. Rayburn captures an old man, who does not say a word. Deeks orders Rayburn and the reluctant Briggman to execute the man on his count while setting up a grenade. As Deeks throws a grenade in front of the man (to make it look like the man threw the grenade at them), Briggman, for the first time on his service, pulls the trigger and kills the man.

Back at the base, most of the platoon happily celebrate while Briggman is traumatized by the incident. Briggman finds Marquez had returned from the hospital and is told that Rayburn is being summoned by the CID for murdering the civilians and Briggman will also be next. Briggman, feeling guilty for his actions, goes to Deeks' office and attempts to commit suicide but cannot bring himself to do it. Briggman and Deeks are then brought to the CID for investigation. Arriving at the CID where his parents are invited to accompany him, the investigator tells Briggman to tell everything about the whole circumstances.

The closing credits reveal that in 2010, five U.S. Army soldiers were charged for the murder of the civilians; Specialist Adam Winfield (depicted as Briggman in the film) pleaded guilty to involuntary manslaughter and was sentenced to three years after he testified in court against Staff Sergeant Gibbs (called Deeks in the film), who was sentenced to life imprisonment.

Cast
 Nat Wolff as Andrew Briggman
 Alexander Skarsgård as Sergeant Deeks
 Adam Long as Rayburn
 Jonathan Whitesell as Coombs
 Brian Marc as Marquez
 Rob Morrow as William Briggman
 Osy Ikhile as Weppler
 Anna Francolini as Laura Briggman
 Oliver Ritchie as Cappy

Production
In October 2016, it was announced Nat Wolff and Alexander Skarsgård had joined the cast of the film, with Dan Krauss directing from a screenplay he wrote. Marty Bowen and Wyck Godfrey will serve as producers on the film under their Temple Hill Entertainment banner. In September 2017, Rob Morrow joined the cast of the film. In November 2017, it was announced Adam Long, Jonathan  Whitesell and Brian Marc joined the cast of the film.

Filming took place in Fuerteventura, one of the Canary Islands.

Release
In November 2018, A24 acquired distribution rights to the film. It had its world premiere at the Tribeca Film Festival on April 27, 2019. It was released on October 25, 2019.

Reception

Box office
, The Kill Team has grossed $415,772 worldwide.

Critical response
The website's critical consensus reads, "Flawed yet viscerally effective, The Kill Team interrogates battlefield morality with a hard-hitting intensity further amplified by a talented cast." On Metacritic, the film has a weighted average score of 60 out of 100, based on 14 critics, indicating "mixed or average reviews".

References

External links
 
 
 
 

2019 war drama films
2019 drama films
2019 films
A24 (company) films
American films based on actual events
American war drama films
Drama films based on actual events
Films about the United States Army
Films about war crimes
Films directed by Dan Krauss
Films produced by Wyck Godfrey
Films scored by Zacarías M. de la Riva
Films shot in the Canary Islands
Temple Hill Entertainment films
War films based on actual events
War in Afghanistan (2001–2021) films
2010s English-language films
2010s American films